Ghenadie Pușca (born 22 April 1975) is a retired Moldovan footballer.

During 2013–2015 he was a head coach of Moldova national under-19 football team.

References

External links
 

1975 births
Living people
Moldovan footballers
Moldova international footballers
Moldovan expatriate footballers
Expatriate footballers in Uzbekistan
Expatriate footballers in Kazakhstan
Expatriate footballers in Belarus
FC Rapid Ghidighici players
FC Tiraspol players
FC Zimbru Chișinău players
FC Nistru Otaci players
FC Okzhetpes players
FC Dacia Chișinău players
FC Savit Mogilev players
Moldovan football managers
Association football midfielders